Masako Mori  may refer to:

, Japanese politician
, Japanese enka singer and former 1970s idol
, Japanese novelist